Baoro is a town located in the Central African Republic prefecture of Nana-Mambéré.

History 
On 20 January 2014 Seleka withdrew from Baoro. Two days later armed Anti-balaka fighters attacked the town killing civilians. Muslims were able to repel the attack and in respinse started killing Christian civilians resulting in more than 100 deads. On 29 January Anti-balaka took control of the town after last Muslims left. In July 2017 Baoro was reportedly under control of security forces (gendarmerie). On 28 December 2020 rebels from Coalition of Patriots for Change took control of the town. It was recaptured by government forces on 8 February 2021.

References 

Sub-prefectures of the Central African Republic
Populated places in the Central African Republic
Populated places in Nana-Mambéré